Aura Films is a British film production company based in Colchester, Essex. Their work has been screened on numerous TV channels and film festivals around the world. The company was founded in 2011 by filmmakers Steven Dorrington and Tristan Syrett.

Filmography

References

External links 
 Official Site

Film production companies of the United Kingdom
Film organisations in the United Kingdom
British filmmakers